Rodney J. Rogers is an American entrepreneur and expert technologist with more than 30 years in the technology services industry. He is known for leadership contributions at two “unicorns” — startups that achieve billion-dollar valuations.

Early life and education
A native of Florida and resident of Miami, Rogers graduated from the University of Florida with a Bachelor of Science degree in Industrial and Systems Engineering.

Career
Rogers started his career in 1988 at Andersen Consulting, known today as Accenture. Rogers developed and implemented software technologies in the manufacturing and distribution industries. He was an early promote to manager in 1992 and was elected to a variety of firmwide leadership committees.

In 1994, he left to work directly for one of his clients, Florida Crystals Corporation. At 28 years old, Rogers was hired to run Florida Crystals Corporation's Consumer Products Division as its general manager, which he continued to do until he co-founded Adjoined in 2000.

Florida Crystals Corporation has remained a customer of Rogers for 25+ years— from Accenture, to Adjoined, through Kanbay, Capgemini, Virtustream, EMC and Dell Technologies.

Adjoined
Rogers was co-founder, chairman and CEO of Adjoined from its inception in 2000 through its acquisition by Kanbay in 2006. Adjoined was one of the fastest growing US-based IT services companies over this time. After the acquisition in 2006, Rogers went onto become COO and SEC Section-16 Officer of Kanbay, a 7,000 person global IT Services firm, reporting directly to the CEO. In 2007, Kanbay was acquired by Capgemini SE for $1.2 billion. After the acquisition, Rogers became managing director of Capgemini's East US Business and served on Capgemini's US Country Managing Board until he retired from Capgemini in 2008.

Virtustream and Dell Technologies
Rogers co-founded Virtustream in 2009 and was chairman and CEO prior to its acquisition by EMC Corporation (now Dell Technologies) in 2015 for $1.2 billion.

The acquisition of Virtustream was one of the largest private technology start-up acquisitions in 2015.

After the EMC acquisition, Virtustream became one of EMC's 4 operating companies with Rogers as CEO reporting directly to the CEO of $24b EMC. In 2016, Dell Technologies acquired EMC for $60+ billion in the largest acquisition in the history of the technology industry. Rogers then led Virtustream through its second successful post-merger integration in as many years, and ultimately on to become one of Dell Technologies’ seven ingredient brands.

From 2016 until the time he retired in 2018, within Dell Technologies, Rogers served as the president of the Virtustream business, a member of both the Dell EMC Infrastructure Solutions Group and Dell Services & Digital executive leadership teams, and as member of the Dell Technologies extended leadership team.

Blue Lagoon Companies
Rogers operates as a founding partner of the Blue Lagoon Companies, which, develops, advises and invests in disruptive technology start-ups and next-generation technology companies.

Awards
Rogers has been the recipient of numerous technology industry awards including being an E&Y Entrepreneur of the Year Finalist three times, an American Business Awards CEO winner and was recognized along with co-founder Kevin Reid as Intel Capital's Entrepreneur/Exit of the Year in 2015.

Personal life
Rogers is an angel investor and adviser to a variety of technology startups. He currently serves as chairman of the board for UnitedLex, Inc. and Lemongrass Ltd, as Lead Board Director for Beep, Inc., and as a board director Revenue Analytics, Inc. and agrematch Ltd.  Rogers previously served on the Board of New Signature, Inc. prior to its sale to Cognizant in 2020.

He is also the co-founder and director of The Blue Lagoon Foundation, a non-profit charitable giving organization, and he established the Rodney & Judith Rogers Entrepreneurial Excellence Endowment for the Warrington School of Business at the University of Florida. Rogers also serves as an advisor to the University of Florida's Innovative Ventures Fund and in 2020 was awarded the University of Florida’s prestigious Distinguished Alumnus Award in recognition of his “achievements, demonstrated service, and exceptional leadership”.

Rogers is co-inventor of US Patent 8,799,920 B2: “Systems and Methods of Host-Aware Resource Management Involving Cluster-Based Resource Pools”. He has also been both the subject and author of several technology industry-related articles and publications.

References

External links
  “Beware Hybrid Cloud Washing,”  Data Center Knowledge, 26 May 2017.
  “Interview with Virtustream CEO Rodney Rogers,” TheCube, 9 May 2017.
  “Interview with Virtustream CEO Rodney Rogers”, TheCube, 4 May 2016.
  “Virtustream CEO: Being Part of a Larger Dell Is 'Exhilarating,” eWeek, 24 October 2016.
  “Don't try too hard to sell your company, says CEO who sold his last company for $1.2 billion,” Business Insider, 5 September 2016.
  “The Enterprise: I’m Not Sexy And I Know It,” TechCrunch, 6 October 2012.
  “Welcome to the Cloud Laundromat,” SiliconAngle, 26 August 2012.

Living people
American chief executives
University of Florida alumni
1965 births
People from Miami